Patriotic Alternative (PA) is a British far-right, neo-Nazi, fascist and white nationalist group which states that it has active branches nationwide. Its stance has been variously described as Islamophobic, fascist and racist.

History
Patriotic Alternative was founded in July 2019 by the British neo-Nazi and, according to Hope Not Hate, antisemitic conspiracy theorist Mark Collett, the former director of publicity of the British National Party. In September 2019, PA held its first conference, with Edward Dutton and Colin Robertson  giving speeches, among others.

In October 2020, counterterrorism experts reported that extremist far-right groups including Patriotic Alternative were using YouTube to try and recruit people, including children "as young as 12". Later that month, Patriotic Alternative members posted leaflets to over 1,000 homes in Hull, England, claiming that white British people will be a minority in Britain by the 2060s and that the COVID-19 lockdown was an attempt to "take away our freedom".

In December 2020, it was reported that Patriotic Alternative's London regional organiser was Nicholas Hill, a 50-year-old former Liberal Democrat councillor from Catford in South London, known by the online pseudonym "Cornelius". That month, during an appearance by the Labour Party leader Keir Starmer on LBC, a caller referring to herself as "Gemma from Cambridge" put forward the white supremacist Great Replacement conspiracy theory. Starmer was widely criticised for his failure to challenge the caller, who was revealed by investigative group Red Flare to be Jody Swingler, a yoga teacher and Patriotic Alternative activist.

A group called the Antifascist Research Collective infiltrated Patriotic Alternative Scotland's private Telegram group. Working with The Ferret, the Telegram group of around 60 people was found to contain individuals who have been members of, or expressed support for, the Scottish Defence League, the neo-Nazi group Blood and Honour, the British National Party, New British Union, the British Union of Fascists and the Scottish Nationalist Society.

In February 2021, it was reported that Patriotic Alternative was looking to recruit teenagers through Call of Duty: Warzone gaming tournaments.

Tabatha Stirling of Stirling Publishing wrote a series of articles for Patriotic Alternative as "Miss Britannia" describing her son's school as "a hellhole for sensible, secure White boys" and claimed "there is one member of staff who is openly gay, and I mean RuPaul extra gay". On 14 March 2021, Julie Burchill announced that, with Stirling, "I've found someone who's JUST LIKE ME", now publishing her book after Little, Brown Book Group dropped Burchill after she made defamatory statements about the Muslim journalist Ash Sarkar. However, Burchill dropped Stirling Publishing when she found out that Stirling was associated with Patriotic Alternative.

Patriotic Alternative's social media accounts on Facebook, Instagram and Twitter were suspended in February 2021, but some of its regional pages remain.

In October 2021, Tim Wills, a Conservative Party councillor for Worthing, was suspended from the party over allegations of secret support for Patriotic Alternative after Hope Not Hate published results of an investigation into him. Wills resigned from the council on 15 October. In a district of Borehamwood, the Hertfordshire Constabulary increased patrols after leaflets calling for the banning of kosher and halal food were posted in letterboxes to several Jewish homes. While it was not considered a hate crime, it was considered a hate incident and was condemned by local representatives of all three major political parties.

On 9 August 2022, Patriotic Alternative held its annual White Lives Matter activism which coincides with the United Nations designated International Day of the World's Indigenous Peoples.

In September 2022, a joint investigation by The Times and the antifascist investigative group Red Flare revealed the identity of a Patriotic Alternative supporter and "Britain’s most racist YouTuber", "The Ayatollah", as James Owens, a 37 year-old journalism graduate from Hixon, a village in Staffordshire.

Links to National Action 
The Times reported in October 2021 that Mark Collett attended combat training with former members of the now-proscribed neo-Nazi organisation National Action. The investigation also revealed that Kris Kearns, who leads Patriotic Alternative's "Fitness Club" initiative, was active in National Action before the group was banned. In August 2022, it was reported that Kearns faces extradition from Spain to the UK, and up to 15 years in prison on terrorism charges relating to the sharing of far-right terrorist manifestos on the encrypted messaging app, Telegram. Sam Melia, a regional organiser for PA, has previously been affiliated with National Action. Alex Davies, the jailed co-founder of National Action, had been active within Patriotic Alternative for more than two years.

Political views 
Patriotic Alternative promotes a white nationalist ideology and aims to combat the "replacement and displacement" of white British people by migrants who "have no right to these lands". They support deportation of people of "migrant descent", and would offer financially-incentivised repatriation for "those of immigrant descent who have obtained British passports". Patriotic Alternative opposes all immigration unless one has a shared cultural and ethnic background or who can prove British ancestry.

According to Hope Not Hate, members of Patriotic Alternative have supported Holocaust denial, political violence and the white genocide conspiracy theory. They have targeted the LGBT community as being a danger to young children. Patriotic Alternative opposes Black Lives Matter and have displayed White Lives Matter banners around the UK, including on the top of Mam Tor, a hill in Derbyshire.

References

External links
Official website

2019 establishments in the United Kingdom
Alt-right organizations
Antisemitism in the United Kingdom
Critics of Black Lives Matter
Fascist parties in the United Kingdom
Far-right political parties in the United Kingdom
Holocaust denial in the United Kingdom
White nationalism in the United Kingdom
Political organisations based in the United Kingdom
Political parties established in 2019
Right-wing parties in Europe
White nationalist parties
Organisations that oppose LGBT rights in the United Kingdom